Eye of the Devil, also known by its working title 13 or Thirteen, is a 1966 British mystery horror film directed by J. Lee Thompson and starring Deborah Kerr, David Niven, Donald Pleasence, Sharon Tate and David Hemmings. Based on the 1964 novel Day of the Arrow by Robin Estridge, the movie is set in rural France. It was shot at the Château de Hautefort and in England.

Plot

Philippe de Montfaucon, Marquis de Bellenac, (David Niven) hereditary owner of an ancient estate in Bordeaux whose vineyards have produced no fruit for three years, lives in Paris with his devoted wife Catherine and two young children. He is abruptly summoned to Bellac, where a sinister priest (Donald Pleasence) gives him a strange amulet. After their son, Jacques, dreams that his father needs him, the Marquise (Deborah Kerr) takes their children to the chateau. When they arrive, archer Christian de Caray  (David Hemmings) shoots a dove, which falls at Catherine's feet. Questioned, Philippe's Aunt Estelle observes that Christian is “a very wicked boy” and his sister Odile (Sharon Tate) is “no better.” She dismisses Catherine, telling her maid “This time, I can't be involved.”

Late at night, Catherine discovers Odile and Christian ceremoniously carrying the impaled dove into a candlelit room where robed figures sit. They present the dove first to an altar whose cross resembles the amulet and then to the figure sitting at the head. The doors close in Catherine's face, and an old man warns her to take her children and never return.

Philippe dismisses Catherine's concerns—the valley is steeped in ancient superstition. He speaks of his family's 1000-year history in Bellenac: He has grave responsibilities. His Aunt tells him she would “rather die” than “say anything” to Catherine, and begs him to flee. Meanwhile, Odile enchants Jacques by changing a toad into a dove.

A family friend, Jean-Claude, helps Catherine discover the Montfaucon history: 22 heads of the family have died in “mysterious circumstances”, going back to the 1200s. Meanwhile, Philippe visits the blighted vineyards and returns to learn that Catherine has ridden out to the tomb of Edouard de Montfaucon. There she finds a carving matching a painting in the chateau and an inscription referring to twelve dancers. Emerging from the mausoleum, she is pursued by robed figures, faints, and revives in her bed. Philippe gives her a sedative and kisses her. She wakes from nightmares to find herself locked in. Breaking open the window shutter, she signals Estel, who sends her maid.

Catherine wakes, and all is normal. The doctor tells her she was given belladonna, a hallucinogen. The community is celebrating  “Les 13 Jours”. People fill the church, where Père Dominic prays in Latin. Philippe kneels alone; Estelle and the children sit in the front pew. Philippe pauses when he sees Catherine, but the priest repeats “Procedamos in pace” (Proceed in peace). Outside, 12 robed figures form a circle in front of Philippe and sway from side to side. Philippe kisses Jacques; the crowd gasps. Philippe welcomes all to the Festival, paraphrasing Genesis 1:11: “Let the Earth bring forth vines, yielding fruit after its kind, whose seed is in itself, upon the earth, and the Word was God”. Estelle screams.

In her room, for Jacques's sake, Estelle reveals to Catherine that her brother Alain, Philippe's father, did not die, but ran away, to escape. He now lives in the tower above. Upstairs, she recognizes Alain, who warned her. He explains: Les Treize Jours/Jouyeurs, the 13 days/dancers, are the 12 apostles dancing around Christ, or in the case of the heretic town of Bellenac, a living god suitable for blood sacrifice. Père Dominic, a pagan, celebrates a Black Mass. When Philippe kissed Jacques, it showed that Philippe was doomed.

Elsewhere, Jacques watches the priest praying over his father. The priest brings Catherine to Philippe. Detached, he tells her it can't be stopped. No one will believe her—No one ever has. He is dying for what he believes, for his people and his faith. He rides away with 12 robed figures and Christian. Catherine escapes, but is too late. Philippe's body is brought home through the vineyards. Jacques watches.

Cut to torrential rain, Jean Claude reading a newspaper account of the “accident”. As he drives the family away, Jacques insists he left his watch behind. Inside, the  priest is waiting for him. Jacques kisses the amulet and runs back to the car.

Cast
 Deborah Kerr as Catherine de Montfaucon, Marquise de Bellenac
 David Niven as Philippe de Montfaucon, Marquis de Bellenac
 Flora Robson as Countess Estelle, Alain's sister
 Donald Pleasence as Père Dominic
 David Hemmings as Christian de Caray
 Sharon Tate as Odile de Caray
 Edward Mulhare as Jean-Claude Ibert
 Emlyn Williams as Alain de Montfaucon, Philippe's father

Production

Development
In his New York Times column Criminals at Large, Anthony Boucher praised the 1964 novel Day of the Arrow, written by Robin Estridge under the pen name Philip Loraine. Boucher compared the book to the works of Daphne du Maurier, Mary Stewart, Victoria Holt, Norah Lofts and Evelyn Berckman, writing that it "tells very much the same kind of brooding, atmospheric story, in very much the same kind of setting (an ancestral castle in the Auvergne), but from a male viewpoint and with a mind working in a completely masculine manner.... This is a setting for [a] highly civilized and aristocratic nightmare, as a young Scottish painter tries to identify the sinister forces that are taking control of his friend the Marquis. The answer will come as no surprise to anyone who has ever leafed through The Golden Bough, but its obviousness in no way diminishes its power. The book is as full of tantalizing and terror‐hinting symbols as a pack of tarot cards, and as oddly vivid in its invented folklore as Ngaio Marsh's Death of a Fool."

Martin Ransohoff of Filmways, who had a multi-picture deal with MGM, bought the film rights to Day of the Arrow.

Estridge adapted his own novel for the screen. Dennis Murphy shared credit for the screenplay. Terry Southern did additional "tightening and brightening" of the script, uncredited.

Kim Novak, who had signed a three-picture deal with Ransohoff in 1961, was signed to play the lead, with Niven co-starring.

Tate had been discovered by Ransohoff when she auditioned for Petticoat Junction. Impressed, he signed her to a seven-year contract. She then spent months studying and playing small roles at Ransohoff's expense, such as a recurring role on The Beverly Hillbillies, before making her feature film debut in Eye of the Devil. Said Ransohoff, "Everybody should make an effort to show a new face in every major picture".

Sidney J. Furie, who had signed a three-picture deal with Ransohoff, was originally slated to direct Eye of the Devil. In August 1965, shortly before filming was to begin, Furie was replaced by Michael Anderson. Anderson fell ill, and was replaced, in turn, by J. Lee Thompson.

Alex Sanders, an English occultist and Wiccan, was hired as a consultant to give the pagan rites some authenticity.

The feature's title was changed from Day of the Arrow to 13 shortly before shooting started.

Shooting
Filming started on 13 September 1965. Shooting locations included the Château de Hautefort and the surrounding area, and MGM British Studios in Borehamwood, England.

In November, two weeks before filming was scheduled to conclude, Novak was thrown from a horse while performing in a key scene, and injured her back. The production shot around Novak while she recovered, filming scenes that did not require her. Novak returned to the set after two weeks, but was exhausted after only a day's work, and forced to take more time off. When the production was told that she would need another eight weeks to recover before returning to work, it was decided to replace her with Kerr, even though this meant reshooting a significant amount of footage, since Novak appeared in nearly three-quarters of what already had been filmed.

"It is tragic, but without Kim or a replacement, we cannot go on," David Niven said. "The person I feel most sorry for is director J. Lee Thompson. He has put everything into this picture." As to Novak's injury, her husband, Richard Johnson, said, "It is not something that will trouble her for the rest of her life. She will recover eventually. It is going to take time and will not be an easy matter." Novak would later say that she had fractured a vertebra.

Filming resumed in December 1965 with Kerr. Some long shots of Novak, filmed before her injury, did make it into the movie.

In his autobiography, Hemmings disputed that Novak had been replaced because of an injury. He said that he had seen a bitter argument take place between Novak and Ransohoff near the end of filming, and that Novak had been sacked as a result.

When asked about working with such a distinguished cast, Tate responded, "Of course I was nervous but I was flattered rather than intimidated because everybody put me at such ease. They are such pros. You don't see their technique but when you are surrounded by the best it brings out the best in you."

Release
Eye of the Devil received little notice. In 1968, the film was listed as one of only three by Ransohoff that had not made money, the other two being Don't Make Waves and The Loved One. Although it was not a commercial success in the United States when first released, Eye of the Devil was popular in Europe. It has acquired a degree of cult status since, largely due to its surreal themes and the murder of Tate in 1969, as well as the distinguished supporting cast.

Tate's debut did not do much for her career. A New York Times review characterized her performance as "chillingly beautiful but expressionless".

Eye of the Devil was the last black-and-white film released by MGM. By 1967, all of the major studios had effectively moved entirely to colour.

Home media
Eye of the Devil was released as a Region 1, widescreen DVD on 21 February 2011 by Warner Home Video, via its Warner Archive DVD-on-demand service.

See also
 List of British films of 1966

Note

References

External links

 
 
 
 

1966 films
1966 horror films
1960s mystery thriller films
1960s supernatural horror films
British black-and-white films
British horror thriller films
British mystery thriller films
British supernatural horror films
British supernatural thriller films
1960s English-language films
Films about cults
Films about wine
Films about witchcraft
Films based on British novels
Films directed by J. Lee Thompson
Films set in castles
Films set in France
Films shot in France
Films shot in Hertfordshire
Filmways films
Folk horror films
Films about human sacrifice
Metro-Goldwyn-Mayer films
Mystery horror films
Films shot at MGM-British Studios
1960s British films